Abdul Hamid Zangeneh (1899–1951) was an Iranian scholar. He served as the minister of education from December 1948 to March 1950. He was assassinated by a member of the Fada'iyan-e Islam in March 1951.

Early life and education
Zangeneh was born in Kermanshah in 1899. He obtained a degree in law and political science in Tehran. He received a PhD in law and economics in Paris in 1929, and his thesis was about the oil economy.

Career
Following his return to Iran in 1935 Zangeneh was employed in the Ministry of Education. He became a professor at the law school of the University of Tehran of which he served as the dean. He was co-editor of the newspaper Iran Javan. Zangeneh represented Kermanshah in the 14th term of the Majlis. In the period between December 1948 and March 1950 he served as the minister of education. He became a member of the central committee of the Socialist Party which was established by Sardar Fakhir Hikmat in July 1949.

Assassination
Zanganeh was assassinated by a student in front of Tehran University on 19 March 1951 and was badly wounded in the back. He died on 25 March. The murderer was Nosratollah Ghumi, a member of the radical group Fada'iyan-e Islam.

References
 

1899 births
1951 deaths
Education ministers of Iran
Iranian expatriates in France
Academic staff of the University of Tehran
People assassinated by the Fada'iyan-e Islam
Assassinated Iranian politicians
Victims of Islamic terrorism
Deaths by firearm in Iran
People from Kermanshah
Iranian socialists
Members of the 14th Iranian Majlis